The 1998 Copa CONMEBOL Finals were the final match series to decide the winner of the 1998 Copa CONMEBOL, a continental cup competition organised by CONMEBOL. The final was contested by Argentine club Rosario Central and Brazilian Santos FC. 

Played under a two-legged tie system, Santos won the first leg held in Estádio Urbano Caldeira in Santos, São Paulo. As the second leg at Estadio Gigante de Arroyito in Rosario ended in a 0–0 tie, Santos won 10 on aggregate, achieving their first Cup trophy.

The series became infamous for the though play from both sides, with many players being penalised with yellow cards and even sent off (only in the second leg in Arroyito, the referee showed the yellow card to eight players and sent off two).

Qualified teams

Venues

Road to the final 

Notes
 QF = quarterfinal
 SF = semifinal

Match details

First leg

Second leg

See also
 1998 Copa CONMEBOL

References

c
c
Copa CONMEBOL Finals
1998 in Argentine football
1998 in Brazilian football